The Prince and the Pauper is an 1881 novel by Mark Twain.

The Prince and the Pauper may also refer to:

The Prince and the Pauper (1915 film), a lost silent adaptation of the novel
The Prince and the Pauper (1920 film), an adaptation starring Tibor Lubinszky as Edward VI and Tom Canty
The Prince and the Pauper (1937 film), an adaptation starring Billy and Bobby Mauch
The Prince and the Pauper (1976 series), an adaptation starring Nicholas Lyndhurst
The Prince and the Pauper (1977 film), an adaptation starring Mark Lester as Edward VI and Tom Canty
The Prince and the Pauper (1990 film), an animated Mickey Mouse short
The Prince and the Pauper, a 1995 animated film produced by Golden Films.
The Prince and the Pauper, a 1996 animated film produced by Phoenix Animation Studios.
The Prince and the Pauper, a 1996 BBC TV mini-series adapted by Julian Fellowes.
The Prince and the Pauper (2000 film), starring Aidan Quinn and Alan Bates, directed by Giles Foster

See also
 List of adaptations of The Prince and the Pauper